Aleksandar Bogdanović may refer to:
 Aleksandar Bogdanović (footballer)
 Aleksandar Bogdanović (politician)